Arch W. McFarlane (April 14, 1885 – July 24, 1960) was an American Republican businessman and politician.

Born in Waterloo, Iowa, McFarlane owned a fuel oil business. McFarlane served in both houses of the Iowa General Assembly and was Lieutenant Governor of Iowa from 1928 to 1933 serving under Governors John Hammill and Daniel Webster Turner. He died in Chicago, Illinois of a heart attack while attending the Republican Party National Convention.

Notes

1885 births
1960 deaths
Politicians from Waterloo, Iowa
Businesspeople from Iowa
Lieutenant Governors of Iowa
Republican Party Iowa state senators
Republican Party members of the Iowa House of Representatives
20th-century American politicians
20th-century American businesspeople